Rebecca Broussard (born January 3, 1963) is an American actress and model.

She was born in Louisville, Kentucky.  From 1987 to 1988, Broussard was married to Richard Perry, a noted record executive who produced albums for Harry Nilsson, Julio Iglesias, Ringo Starr and Carly Simon, though the couple had no children together. Broussard has two children with actor Jack Nicholson, whom she was with from 1989 to 1994: daughter Lorraine Nicholson (born April 16, 1990) and son Raymond Nicholson (born February 20, 1992). Since 2001, she has been married to actor Alex Kelly.

Filmography

References

External links

1963 births
American film actresses
Actresses from Louisville, Kentucky
Living people
20th-century American actresses
21st-century American actresses